Dichomeris lamprostoma is a moth of the family Gelechiidae. It was described by Zeller in 1847. It is found in France and Spain, as well as on Sardinia, Sicily, Crete, Cyprus and the Canary Islands. It has also been recorded from Kenya and the United Arab Emirates.

The larvae feed on Convolvulus althaeoides and Convolvulus arvensis. They spin the leaves of their host plant, and mine them from within a silken tube. Larvae can be found from May to June and in November.

References

Moths described in 1847
lamprostoma
Moths of Europe
Moths of Asia